Archambaud VIII of Bourbon, nicknamed the Great, (1189–1242) was a ruler (sire) of Bourbonnais in the modern region of Auvergne, France. His parents were Guy II of Dampierre and Mathilde of Bourbon. 

Archambaud’s first wife was Alix de Forez. They married in 1205. Before she was repudiated, Alix bore:
Margaret
Archambaud IX of Bourbon

Archambaud later married Beatrice de Montluçon, who bore him; 
William (Seigneur of Beçay)
Marie, wife of John I of Dreux
Beatrice, wife of Beraud VI of Mercœur

Notes

References

Sources

House of Dampierre
1242 deaths
1189 births